Zlatna Panega may refer to:

 Zlatna Panega (river), a river in Bulgaria
 Zlatna Panega (village), in Yablanitsa municipality, Lovech Province